Santa Maria della Scala (English: Mary of the Staircase) is a titular church in Rome, Italy, located in the Trastevere rione. Cardinal Ernest Simoni took possession of the titular church on 11 February 2017. Santa Maria della Scala is a titular church.

History
The church Santa Maria della Scala is located on the square of the same name. It was built under the patronage of Pope Clement VIII between 1593 and 1610 to house a miraculous icon of the Madonna. Tradition holds that a midwife with a dying child in her arms prayed under the stairs of a house where the image of the Madonna was present, and the child was immediately revived. Consecrated to Mary, mother of Jesus, the church enshrines that icon in the north transept, alongside a baroque statue of St John of the Cross. The church was built on the site of a house once bequeathed to a Casa Pia founded by Pope Pius IV in 1563 for reformed prostitutes. In 1597, the church was granted to the Discalced Carmelites.

Bronze statues of the Twelve Apostles were stolen from the sacristy during the Napoleonic era, and subsequently replaced by papier-mâché.

In 1849, during the last stages of the revolutionary Roman Republic's resistance to the invading French forces, Santa Maria della Scala was used as a hospital where Garibaldi's soldiers, who were wounded fighting in the Trastevere, were treated.

Cardinal protectors
 Paolo Savelli (February 1664 – January 1669)
 Buonaccorso Buonaccorsi (May 1670 – April 1678)
 Giovanni Francesco Ginetti (September 1681 - January 1682)
 Johannes Walter Sluse (September 1686 Installed - †Jul 1687)
 Carlo Colonna (June 1706 - May 1715)
 Alessandro Falconieri  (1724–1734)
 Luis Antonio Jaime de Borbón y Farnesio (December 1735 - 18 December 1754)
 Gregorio Salviati (Jul 1777 - September 1780)
 Prospero Caterini (March 1853 - †October 1881)
 Augusto Theodoli (June 1886 - †June 1892)
 Girolamo Maria Gotti, O.C.D. (December 1895 - †March 1916)
 Camillo Laurenti  (June 1921 - †September 1938)
 José María Caro Rodríguez  (May 1946 - †December 1958)
 Julius August Döpfner  (December 1958 - †Jul 1976)
 Carlos Oviedo Cavada, O. de M.  (November 1994 - †December 1998) 
 Nguyễn Văn Thuận (February 2001 - September 2002)
 Stanisław Nagy (October 2003 - June 2013)
 Ernest Simoni (November 2016 - )

Architecture

The two-story travertine facade was completed in 1624. The Baroque Madonna and Child in the niche over the entrance was sculpted by Francesco di Cusart in 1633. In 1650, nearly fifty years after the buildings completion, Carlo Rainaldi designed for the church a tempietto-shaped baldachino with 16 slender jasper Corinthian columns and a high altar. Four statues of the Evangelists were looted in 1849 and replaced by terracotta ones.

The interior has a nave with three chapels on each side. Its choir, nave and north transept's vaults are decorated with paintings intended to resemble moldings, whilst the south transept has actual stucco relief moldings.

Chapels
 Chapel of Our Lady of Mount Carmel -The first chapel on the left has a painting of the Carmelite Simon Stock by Cristoforo Roncalli. 
 Chapel of the Assumption  -Lawyer Laerzio Cherubini had commissioned a painting from Caravaggio suitable as an altarpiece for the second chapel on the left. This was the Death of the Virgin. Rumors held that Caravaggio had used a prostitute as a model for the dead virgin. The Carmelites rejected the painting, which was then purchased by Vincenzo Gonzaga, Duke of Mantua. When Caravaggio's "Death of the Virgin" was rejected in 1606, it was Carlo Saraceni who provided an acceptable substitute, which remains in situ. Above the altar is a statue of the Infant Jesus of Prague.
 Chapel of the Crucifixion 
 Chapel of St John the Baptist - The first chapel on the right is dedicated to St John the Baptist. The altarpiece, the "Beheading of St. John the Baptist", is by Gerrit van Honthorst.
 Chapel of St Hyacinth - The second chapel on the right is dedicated to St Hyacinth; the altarpiece of "Our Lady with SS Hyacinth and Catherine of Siena" is by Antiveduto Grammatica.
 Chapel of St Joseph - The third chapel on the right contains Giovanni Odazzi's Dream of Joseph.
 Chapel of Our Lady of the Stairs - the left side transept holds the original miraculous icon.
 Chapel of the Relic - left of the sanctuary, this chapel contains a relic of St Teresa of Avila.
 Chapel of St Teresa of Jesus - The right transept altar is dedicated to St Teresa of Avila.

San Giuseppe Hall houses a collection by Tito Sarrocchi.

Burials
 Giovanni Antonio Guadagni
 Nguyễn Văn Thuận

Pharmacy
Around 1600, the friars built a monastery next door famous for containing the Papal court's 17th century pharmacy (Antica Spezieria di Santa Maria della Scala) on the second floor. The friars prepared their medicines with herbs from the attached garden. In the 18th century, the apothecary also began to train future pharmacists. In 1873 the convent and garden was confiscated by the government and the convent turned into a police station; the Carmelites retained the church.

The former pharmacy now houses a museum, containing the herbarium, and the original scales for weighing medicines, the machines for making pills, oil mills, mortars, and alembic stills. The furnishings, shelves, showcases and counter are from the eighteenth century.

References

External links

 Cardinal Titular Church, Catholic Hierarchy

17th-century Roman Catholic church buildings in Italy
Maria Scala
Religious organizations established in 1610
1610 establishments in the Papal States
1610 establishments in Italy
Churches of Rome (rione Trastevere)
Roman Catholic churches completed in 1610